Surat high-speed railway station is a under construction railway station on the Mumbai–Ahmedabad high-speed rail corridor. It is located in the city of Surat, Gujarat, India. This station is India's first high-speed railway station. The railway station is scheduled to be completed by December 2024. The Surat station will be operational by 2026 along with the country's first high-speed railway.

Lines 
Surat high-speed railway station will be served by the Mumbai–Ahmedabad high-speed rail corridor, and is located 266.200 km from the official starting point of the Mumbai–Ahmedabad high-speed rail corridor in Mumbai.

Station layout 
The Surat High-Speed Railway station will have two elevated opposite platforms, With the under constructed station building will be located underneath. The Railway station will have two side platforms, serving 2 tracks for regular service.

References

High-speed railway stations in Gujarat
Transport in Surat
Buildings and structures in Surat